The American Church in Berlin (ACB) (Amerikanische Kirche in Berlin) is an ecumenical and international congregation in Berlin that was established in the 19th century.

 ACB's members come from more than seventeen Christian denominations and from more than thirty different nations. The congregation is loosely affiliated  with the Evangelical Lutheran Church in America, from which the congregation receives clergy support.

History
The origins of the church date back to about 1865, when American families met in private homes to worship. Otto March, father of the architects Walter and Werner March, planned and directed the construction of a church for the congregation between 1898 and 1903. This church building stood in the "American quarter" of Berlin-Schöneberg, on Motzstraße #6, near Nollendorfplatz.

The Nollendorfplatz church was destroyed in an Allied bombing of Berlin in 1944. The congregation continued from 1945 by sharing facilities with various German churches in Berlin-Zehlendorf, for the most part in Zehlendorf's Alte Dorfkirche.

 On 8 November 2002 ACB moved into the Luther Church on Dennewitzplatz in Schöneberg, only a few city blocks away from the original sanctuary that was destroyed in 1944.

Today
The American Church in Berlin is an active English-speaking worshiping community in Berlin. They hold services each Sunday in the Lutherkirche on Dennewitzplatz.  They also offer Christian education programs for children, youth, and adults.

The congregation has been involved in the Berlin-wide program "Laib und Seele" since 2005.  This program facilitates produce pick-ups from surrounding grocery stores to be distributed to neighborhood families in need each Friday.

The congregation also has an English-language learning program for both children and adults that meets weekly.

See also
American Church in Paris
American Church in Rome

References

Sources
 Stewart Winfield Herman, American Church in Berlin: a history, 1978

External links

 Official website

Churches in Berlin
Buildings and structures in Tempelhof-Schöneberg
Churches completed in 1903
Berlin American Church
Buildings and structures in Berlin destroyed during World War II